Ibrahim Mohammad Khraishi (born 1956) is a Palestinian politician and diplomat. He is Deputy Foreign Affairs Minister of the Palestinian National Authority, Palestine's ambassador to Switzerland, and Permanent Observer representing Palestine for the United Nations at Geneva.

Early years
Khraishi was born in Tulkarm, Palestine on 26 March 1956. He has a degree in medicine from Belgrade University and in international law from the International Center for Human Rights in Strasbourg.

Political and diplomatic life
In 1990 he became chairman of the General Union of Palestinian Students. Five years later he was appointed head of the Final Status Negotiations Department of the Palestine Liberation Organization. He was elected to the Palestinian Central Council in 1997 and to the Fatah Revolutionary Council in 2004. He has served as Director of International Affairs in the Palestinian Foreign Ministry.

Khraishi is a member of the Palestinian Coalition for Peace and Deputy Foreign Affairs Minister of the Palestinian National Authority. In 2008 he became a Permanent Observer representing Palestine for the United Nations and, in 2010, Palestine's ambassador to Switzerland.

References

1956 births
Palestine Liberation Organization members
People from Tulkarm
Permanent Observers of Palestine to the United Nations
Palestinian diplomats
Palestinian politicians
Living people
Members of the Palestinian Central Council
Fatah members
Members of the Palestinian National Council